Krahlizek is a closed-ended, computer moderated, play-by-mail (PBM) game.

History and development
Krahlizek was a closed-ended play-by-mail game. Aggressive Addiction Games published the game in the United States, while Phildee Enterprises published it in the United Kingdom.

Gameplay
Krahlizek was a game of conquest. Players won by controlling the most territory at the end of the game. Games typically lasted 21–30 turns. Combat was a key element of the game, with economics, spying, and politics also factors.

Reception
Nick Palmer reviewed the game in a 1995 issue of Flagship, noting it was a good game for novices. He stated that "it's well-finished: almost entirely bug-free, well-balanced, exciting, and both victory nor defeat are rarely quite certain".

See also
 List of play-by-mail games

References

Bibliography

Further reading

 
 
 
 
 
 
 

Wargames
Multiplayer games
Play-by-mail games